Sir Thomas Bootle (bapt. 16 May 1685 – 25 December 1753) was an English landowner and Member of Parliament.

He was the eldest son of Robert Bootle of Maghull, Lancashire and studied law at Lincoln's Inn (1708) and the Inner Temple (1712) and was called to the bar in 1713. He served as King's attorney and serjeant within the Duchy of Lancaster from 1712 to 1727 and was created a KC by 1726.

He succeeded his father in 1708 and bought the Lathom House estate at Lathom, near Skelmersdale, Lancashire. There he commissioned Giacomo Leoni to replace the existing house with the finest Palladian house in the county. Started in 1725 it was completed in 1740.

He was elected Member of Parliament for Liverpool in 1724, sitting until 1734 and for Midhurst from 1734 to 1753. He was Mayor of Liverpool for 1726–27.

He was attorney-general of the county palatine of Durham from 1733 to 1753. He was chancellor to Frederick, Prince of Wales in 1740–51 and to George, Prince of Wales from 1751 to his death. He was knighted in 1745.

Bootle died unmarried in Oxford in 1753. Lathom House passed to his younger brother Robert and then to Robert's daughter Mary.

References

|-

1685 births
1753 deaths
People from Maghull
Members of Lincoln's Inn
Members of the Inner Temple
Mayors of Liverpool
Members of the Parliament of Great Britain for Liverpool
British MPs 1722–1727
British MPs 1727–1734
British MPs 1734–1741
British MPs 1741–1747
British MPs 1747–1754
Knights Bachelor